Blot may refer to:

Surname 
Guillaume Blot (born 1985), French racing cyclist
Harold W. Blot (born 1938), served as United States Deputy Chief of Staff for Aviation
Jean-François Joseph Blot (1781–1857), French soldier and politician
Yvan Blot (1948–2018), French conservative political figure, founder and president of the Club de l'Horloge
Jean Blot (1923–2019), French writer, translator, and senior civil servant of Russian origin
 (born 1983), French judoka

Other 
Blot (biology), method of transferring proteins, DNA, RNA or a protein onto a carrier
Blót, a sacrifice to the gods or other beings in Germanic paganism and Germanic neopaganism
Blot (album), a 2003 album by Einherjer, referring to the Germanic practice
The Blot, a 1921 silent film
Another name of a trick-taking card game Belot
Blot (Transformers), a character from the Transformers franchise
Ink blots, as used in the Rorschach test
 Blot (1994 film), a 1994 film

See also
 "Hefja Blot", a song by Danheim for his album Friðr
 "Blotjarl", a song by ]]Danheim]] and Heldom for his album Skapanir
 "Vetrnátta Blot", a song by ]]Danheim]] and Heldom for his album Skapanir
Phantom Blot, a character made by the Walt Disney Company
Saint-Rémy-de-Blot, commune in the Puy-de-Dôme department in Auvergne in central France
The Blot on the Shield, 1915 short film directed by B. Reeves Eason
Blott (disambiguation)